Ring 1 or Ring 2 may refer to:

 Ring 1 (disambiguation)
 Ring 2 (disambiguation)

See also 
 Ring (disambiguation)